WNJX-TV (channel 4) is a Spanish-language independent television station in Mayagüez, Puerto Rico. It is a full-time satellite of San Juan–based WAPA-TV (channel 4), owned by Hemisphere Media Group. WNJX-TV's transmitter is located at Monte del Estado in Maricao, while its parent station maintains studios on Avenida Luis Vigoreaux in Guaynabo.

WNJX-TV's fourth digital subchannel operates as a full-time satellite of Telemundo owned-and-operated station WKAQ-TV (channel 2) under a time brokerage agreement with NBCUniversal's Telemundo Station Group. Branded on-air as Telemundo West, this subchannel is mapped to virtual channel 2.12 rather than 4.4. WNJX-DT4's parent station maintains studios on Roosevelt Avenue in San Juan.

Technical information

Subchannels
The station's digital signal is multiplexed:

Analog-to-digital conversion
WNJX-TV shut down its analog signal over UHF channel 22, on June 12, 2009, the official date in which full-power television stations in the United States transitioned from analog to digital broadcasts under federal mandate. The station's digital signal remained on its pre-transition UHF channel 23. Through the use of PSIP, digital television receivers display the station's virtual channel at VHF channel 4.

References

External links 
WAPA-TV – Official website
Telemundo Puerto Rico – Official website for Telemundo Puerto Rico

Independent television stations in the United States
Telemundo network affiliates
Mayagüez, Puerto Rico
Television channels and stations established in 1986
1986 establishments in the United States
NJX-TV